The Frankstown Branch Juniata River is a  tributary of the Juniata River in Blair and Huntingdon counties, Pennsylvania, in the United States.

The headwater tributaries of the Frankstown Branch rise on the slopes of the Allegheny Front south of Altoona. The Frankstown Branch forms at the village of Claysburg by the confluence of Beaverdam Creek and South Poplar Run, then flows north along the western base of Dunning Mountain. Passing just east of Hollidaysburg, the river turns east briefly at Frankstown before heading northeast along the western base of Lock Mountain. Turning southeast at Point View, the river breaks through the mountain in a water gap and passes Williamsburg, then turns north again, now against the western base of Tussey Mountain. At Water Street, the river again turns east to break through a water gap, then passes the borough of Alexandria before joining the Little Juniata River to form the main stem of the Juniata River.

The Warrior Ridge Dam and Hydroelectric Plant is located on the Frankstown Branch in Logan Township and Porter Township in Huntingdon County.

Tributaries
Clover Creek, in Cove Forge
Piney Creek, west of Williamsburg
Fox Run, forming the border of Blair and Huntingdon counties
Roaring Run, north of Mount Etna
Yellow Spring Run, south of Mount Etna
Canoe Creek, dammed to form Canoe Lake within Canoe Creek State Park
Beaverdam Branch of the Juniata River, flowing into the Frankstown branch south of Frankstown
Poplar Run, east of Newry
McDonald Run, south of Newry
Halter Creek, south of Newry
Polecat Run, north of Claysburg
Pawpaw Run, south of East Freedom
South Dry Run, at East Freedom
Oldtown Run, from the West Loop area in Hollidaysburg

See also
List of rivers of Pennsylvania

References

External links
U.S. Geological Survey: PA stream gaging stations

Rivers of Blair County, Pennsylvania
Rivers of Huntingdon County, Pennsylvania
Rivers of Pennsylvania
Tributaries of the Juniata River